Graignes may refer to:
Graignes, Manche, a former commune in the Manche department in northwestern France that was merged in 2007 with the commune of Le Mesnil-Angot to form Graignes-Mesnil-Angot
Battle of Graignes, a battle near this commune that started on June 6, 1944